I Like to Score is a compilation album by American electronica musician Moby. It was released on October 10, 1997 by Mute Records in the United Kingdom and Elektra Records in the United States. The album primarily consists of music recorded by Moby for use in film soundtracks.

Track listing

Personnel 
Credits for I Like to Score adapted from album liner notes.

 Moby – production, recording, instruments
 Osho Endo – trombone on "James Bond Theme (Moby's Re-Version)"
 Rob Hardt – saxophone on "James Bond Theme (Moby's Re-Version)"
 MC Shah-King – vocals on "Ah-Ah"
 Alexander McCabe – saxophone on "James Bond Theme (Moby's Re-Version)"
 Daniel Miller – mixing on "James Bond Theme (Moby's Re-Version)"
 Alan Moulder – mixing on "James Bond Theme (Moby's Re-Version)"
 Greg Robinson – trombone on "James Bond Theme (Moby's Re-Version)"

Artwork and design
 Alli – art direction, design
 Jennifer Elster – styling
 Scott Frassetto – photography
 Adam Friedberg – photography

Charts

References

External links 
 
 

1997 compilation albums
Moby compilation albums
Mute Records compilation albums
Elektra Records compilation albums
Albums produced by Moby